Petros Stefanou (born on 17 August 1963, Ermoupoli, Syros, Greece) is a Catholic prelate and Bishop of the Roman Catholic Diocese of Syros and Milos from 13 May 2014.

Biography

Stefanou is a graduate of the University of Athens, in Economics. On 26 June 1994 Stefanou was ordained deacon and on 15 July 1995 Catholic priest. On 13 May 2014 Pope Francis appointed him Bishop of the Roman Catholic Diocese of Syros and Milos, Santorini and apostolic administrator of the Roman Catholic Diocese of Crete. On 2 July 2014 Stefanou was ordained bishop.

References

External links
 http://www.catholic-hierarchy.org/bishop/bstefanou.html
 http://press.vatican.va/content/salastampa/it/bollettino/pubblico/2014/05/13/0344/00755.html

1963 births
Living people
People from Ermoupoli
21st-century Roman Catholic bishops in Greece
National and Kapodistrian University of Athens alumni